Pokrovka is a rural locality (a selo) in Kuganaksky Selsoviet, Sterlitamaksky District, Bashkortostan, Russia. The population was 843 as of 2010.

Geography 
It is located 30 km from Sterlitamak, 7 km from Bolshoy Kuganak.

References 

Rural localities in Sterlitamaksky District